Equus is a fictional comic book supervillain, a cyborg mercenary in the DC Comics universe who serves as an opponent of Superman.  Created by writer Brian Azzarello and artist Jim Lee, he first appeared in Superman (vol. 2) #206, which was published in June 2004 as part of the "For Tomorrow" storyline.

Publication history
Equus first appears in the third issue of the year-long "For Tomorrow" storyline that ran in Superman in 2004 and early 2005. A prototype for the OMAC Project, he comes into conflict with Superman when the superhero discovers that "The Vanishing", an event in which one million people completely disappeared from the face of the Earth (including his wife, Lois Lane), is traced to an unspecified country in the Middle East. Investigating, Superman intervenes in a civil war by using his speed to snatch all the guns from a group of men fighting one another. The fighting continues however, and in his continued quest to put an end to it, Superman confronts Equus, a large, monstrous, cybernetically enhanced humanoid creature whose claws are capable of piercing Superman's skin. General Nox, the leader of the rebels, puts an end to the fight between the two beings, telling Superman that his side has won the war, and showing him that the people outside the palace where Superman and Equus had fought were now cheering Nox's name.

Although Superman initially stands down, he later appears before Nox, who has captured an advanced-looking device from the deposed regime, which his lieutenant informed him was, according to the confession of a minister of that regime, the weapon that was responsible for The Vanishing. Although still operational, it lacks any accuracy, functioning like a shotgun. Superman then appears, demanding to know of the weapon's origins, and when Nox informs him that the former king had intended to use it against Nox, and that the King is to be executed, along with more than a dozen other members of the king's regime, Superman intervenes, feeling that the condemned men deserve a trial, again coming to blows with Equus, who carries out the execution. During the fight, Superman rips the claws right out of Equus' right arm, and seemingly defeats him. Superman then returns to Nox's palace, confronting him with the question of what he intends to do with the weapon, but Equus also appears, and ignores Nox's orders to stand down, saying that he is not being paid by Nox. Nox reminds him that Equus is there to aid him, but Equus brushes Nox aside, and attacks Superman. Superman is less forgiving in this rematch, using his X-ray and microscopic visions to learn much about Equus' enhancements, and physically disabling much of their exterior components. Equus escapes by activating the weapon, causing not only himself to vanish, but another 300,000 other people from across the planet. Superman subsequently learns that Equus has been working for a mysterious mustached man named Mr. Orr, who explains to Superman that Orr's employers financed Nox's war, and loaned Equus to them. Eventually, Superman tracks all the victims of the Vanishing to Metropia, an artificial paradise within the Phantom Zone, where he again encountered Equus, who has allied himself with General Zod, who is on a campaign to destroy Metropia. Equus, whose chestplate bears the Roman numeral "III", was the third version of a program to create super-soldiers. Equus, or "Vee Three" as he was designated, is said to be psychotic, due to the enlargement of the amygdalae to which the OMAC candidates were subjected.

Equus III later appears in Titans/Outsiders Secret Files 2005, stored alongside the Wildebeest, who had been captured in the same story.

Equus reappeared under Mr. Orr's command in Countdown #36 (2007), clashing with Karate Kid and Triplicate Girl. After receiving a beating from Karate Kid, Equus was enraged that Mr. Orr, under Desaad's orders, would let them go. Equus severs the railroad tracks on which Karate Kid and Triplicate Girl's train is traveling, after having phoned the police, telling them that the derailment is a metahuman attack, and that the metahumans themselves are bio-weapons, leading the officers to shoot first and not ask questions. Karate Kid and Una eventually are able to beat Equus, disabling him and leaving him without an arm. The arm is retrieved for attachment, and Orr sets the Legionnaires on Buddy Blank's tracks.

In the 2008 Cyborg miniseries, the Titans are forced to fight numerous clones of Equus and the Wildebeest to prevent them from helping Victor Stone battle Mr. Orr's "Cyborg Revenge Squad".

Powers and abilities
Equus is a human being who has undergone extensive genetic engineering, cybernetic enhancements, hormone therapy, and trans-species implantation as part of the One Man Army Corps (OMAC) project, which selected cancer patients as its subjects. Equus was the project's third version (or V3), immediately preceding his successor, Father Daniel Leone. Cancer was the platform on which the enhancements were based, as the cellular mutation responsible for the disease provided a stable environment for "massive intrusion and acceleration".

Equus stands approximately twice as tall as other humans, and possesses massive musculature on his upper torso. He has white skin composed of crocodilian skin cells laced with self-healing hinge molecules. His internal cybernetics are built upon a haptic interface, through which the numerous cables attached along various points of his body, and covering his head, are connected. His circulatory system includes webs of titanium-reinforced biometric arteries, and his endocrine system is filled with synthetic steroids, adrenaline, and endorphins. The artificial portions of his anatomy include three grades of soft plastic that Superman had never seen before prior to his first encounter with Equus. Equus' mechanical components are powered by a system of oligotronic solar powered fuel cells controlling seven different senses, and his nervous system is powered by enough electricity to power a city block.

He is capable of extending five razor-sharp claws from the knuckles of both of his hands, in a manner similar to the character of Wolverine. The claws corresponding to his fingers are approximately a foot long (with those corresponding to his thumbs considerably smaller), and while their composition is unknown, they are capable, given the physical strength Equus is capable of exerting with them, of piercing Superman's skin.

Equus, the third version of the One Man Army Corps project, along with his predecessor, the second version, had their amygdalae enlarged as part of their genetic modifications, though this was scaled back for the subsequent versions, according to Mr. Orr, because this made the subjects psychotic. Specimens from the project that produced Equus were also said to have the wingbones of a fallen angel within their forearms.

Equus has a wide face with two small eyes (alternately depicted as yellow or red), a small, snout-like nose, a row of large, shark-like teeth, and no hair. Where his ears would be are two ports into which several cables from his cybernetics connect. Exterior enhancements include two spectacle-like devices on his eyes. He is capable of quickly regenerating entire limbs that are severed from his body.

Beginning with vol. 4 The OMAC Project, in addition to reducing the subjects' amygdalae enlargement, added nanoparticle magneto-rheological fluids, housed in a carbon nanotubular vasculature system, in order to give the subjects the ability to continue functioning after death.

References

External links

Characters created by Brian Azzarello
Characters created by Jim Lee
Comics characters introduced in 2005
DC Comics characters with accelerated healing
DC Comics characters with superhuman strength
DC Comics cyborgs
Fictional characters with superhuman durability or invulnerability
Superman characters